Simplified directional facility (SDF) is a localizer-based instrument non-precision approach to an airport, which provides final approach course similar to instrument landing system (ILS) and localizer type directional aid (LDA) approaches, although not as precise.

The SDF signal is fixed at either 6 or 12 degrees, as necessary to provide maximum flyability and optimum course quality. Unlike an ILS, an SDF does not provide vertical guidance in the form of a glideslope. The SDF course may or may not be aligned with the runway because its antenna may be offset from the runway centerline. Usable off-course indications are limited to 35 degrees either side of the course centerline.

Current SDF approaches in the United States   
On January 1, 2018, the SDF approach at KMFI was permanently decommissioned leaving only one remaining operational SDF approach in the United States.

 KMOR, SDF RWY 05, Moore–Murrell Airport, Morristown, TN

See also 
 Instrument approach
 Instrument landing system
 Localizer type directional aid

References

External links
 Aeronautical Information Manual (AIM), published in US by Federal Aviation Administration
 FAA NOTAM website

Aircraft landing systems